Sovla (also, Beyuk Sovla, Beyuk-Sola, and Soulu) is a village and municipality in the Kurdamir Rayon of Azerbaijan.

References 

Populated places in Kurdamir District